

Gallery

The Early Birds of Aviation is an organization devoted to the history of early pilots. The organization was started in 1928 and accepted a membership of 598 pioneering aviators.

Membership was limited to those who piloted a glider, gas balloon, or airplane, prior to December 17, 1916, covering the entirety of the pioneer era of aviation, and just over two years into World War I. The cutoff date was set at December 17 to correspond to the first flights of Wilbur and Orville Wright. 1916 was chosen as a cutoff because a large number of people were trained in 1917 as pilots for World War I. Twelve of the aviators were women.

The original organization dissolved once the last living member had died. This occurred with the death of 99-year-old George D. Grundy Jr. on May 19, 1998. The organization was restarted and is devoted to collecting and publishing biographies on those who met the 1916 deadline. There were many pilots who soloed before the 1916 deadline who never applied to the club to be members. Some have been made honorary members.

Members
Early Birds of Aviation members:

A
Nicholas Rippon Abberly (18911983). Born on March 25, 1891, he built and flew a pusher configuration aircraft in Mineola, New York, on Long Island in September 1910. He soloed the aircraft in October 1910. He died in April 1983.
Lieutenant Steadham Acker (18961952). Born on March 31, 1896, in Talladega, Alabama, to William H. Acker, he was a Lieutenant in the Naval Air Service from 1918 to 1919. He was the general manager of the Birmingham Municipal Airport and founded the Birmingham Aero Club on January 31, 1932. Acker and Rountree founded and managed the National Air Carnival, an annual Birmingham based airshow. In 1946 he became the director for the National Aviation Clinic in Oklahoma City and ran the Omaha airshow. He died on October 22, 1952, in Jefferson, Alabama, at age 56.
Raynold Edward Acre (18891966)
Baxter Harrison Adams (18851951)
Clara Adams (18841971) ♀ Known as the "maiden flights," Adams set a number of records as a female aircraft passenger (not a pilot). She took her first flight in 1914. She flew on the maiden voyage of the Graf Zeppelin and the Hindenburg air ships. She was a member of the Women's International Association of Aeronautics.
Walter Joseph Addems (18991997) was the penultimate member of the Early Birds of Aviation to die.
William Herbert Aitken (18871964)
Eduardo Aldasoro Suárez (18941968)
Juan Pablo Aldasoro (18931962)
Archibald Livingston Allan (18861954). He was born on December 20, 1886, in Bayonne, New Jersey. He died in 1954.
Walter E. Allen  (??)
Malcolm Graeme Allison (18941984) 
Lawrence Malcolm Allison (18941974)
Francis Inman Amory (18951974)
Alex Francis Arcier (18901969)
Charles Anthony Arens (18951967) was the secretary of the Early Birds of Aviation. He was born on December 17, 1895, in Chicago, Illinois.
Robert James Armor (18871972)
Edward Robert Armstrong (18761955)
Robert T. Armstrong (?1936)
George B. Arnold (18931956)
General Henry Harley Arnold (18861950)
Arthur Cruger Aston (18971988)
William Vincent Astor (18911959). His father was John Jacob Astor IV who died in the Titanic disaster
Bert Milton Atkinson (18871937)
Harry Nelson Atwood (18831967)
Stuart Francis Auer (18981958)
Reinhardt Norbert Ausmus (18961970), aka Reiny Ausmus
William L. Avery (?1942)

B
Vearne Clifton Babcock (18871972)
Lieutenant William Bartlett Bacon (1897?). He was born on May 27, 1897, in Brookline, Massachusetts.
Edgar Wirt Bagnell (18901958), learned to fly at Newport News, Virginia, in 1915. He died at a nursing home in Berkeley, California, on August 27, 1958.
Frederick Walker Baldwin (18821948)
William Ivy Baldwin (18661953)
Horace Clyde Balsley (18931942)
Neil Bangs (??)
Captain Horatio Claude Barber (18751964)
Floyd Edward Barlow (18891977)
Ralph Stanton Barnaby (18931986)
George E. Barnhart (18961962)
Richard Bernard Barnitz (18911960)
Rutledge Bermingham Barry (18961967)
Carl Sterling Bates (18841956)
Lieutenant Edmond Elkins Bates (18961982)
Mortimer Fleming Bates (18831961)
Carl Truman Batts (18921969)
Hillery Beachey (18851964)
George William Beatty (18871955)
Harvey Arthur Beilgard (18881943)
Frank J. Bell (18851957)
Giuseppe Mario Bellanca (18861960)
Edward Antoine Bellande (18971976)
Patrick Nieson Lynch Bellinger (18851962)
Joseph S. Bennett (?1955)
Lester Frank Bishop (18891967)
Filip Augustin Björklund (18861967). He was born on December 6, 1886. He died on July 10, 1967, in Goteborg, Sweden.
Louis Charles Joseph Blériot (18721936)
Joseph Anthony Blondin (?1952)
Pierre de Lagarde Boal (18951966)
Edward R. Boland (18921967). He was born on June 5, 1892. He died in 1967.
Joseph John Boland (18791964)
Alfred Bolognesi (18861972)
Allan Francis Bonnalie (18931983). He was born on September 29, 1893, in Colorado. He died on January 29, 1983, in San Diego, California. He was inducted into the Colorado Aviation Hall of Fame
Carl Richard Borkland (18951951)
William Bouldin III (18851953)
Overton Martin Bounds (18951942)
George Norris Boyd (18891981)
Philip Boyer (?1950)
Jesse Cyril Brabazon (18851970)
John Moore-Brabazon, 1st Baron Brabazon of Tara (18841964)
Eric Thompson Bradley (1894?)
Caleb Smith Bragg (18851943). He was born on November 23, 1885, in Cincinnati, Ohio. He died on October 24, 1943, at Memorial Hospital in Manhattan, New York City.
Fred H. Brauninger (18871950)
Homer Ludwig Bredouw (18961950)
Louis Charles Breguet (18801955)
Lewis Hyde Brereton (18901967)
George Howard Brett (18861963)
Bruno Brevonesi (??)
Georgia Ann Thompson Broadwick (18931978) ♀
Walter Lawrence Brock (18851964)
William S. Brock (18951932).
Walter Richard Brookins (18891953).
John B. Brooks (18911975)
Gerald Evan Brower (18931941)
Harold Haskell Brown (18721950)
Harry Bingham Brown (18831954).
Lawrence W. Brown (?1945)
Ralph Myron Brown (18931977)
W. Norman Brown (?1976) of Toronto, Ontario, Canada.
Harry Augustine Bruno (18931978)
John C. Bryan (?1932)
Mahlon P. Bryan (?1932)
Alys McKey Bryant (18801954) ♀
Frank M. Bryant (?1957)
Gilbert George Budwig (18951978)
Walter R. Bullock (18991986)
Vernon Lee Burge (18881971)
Vincent Justus Burnelli (18951964)
Arthur C. Burns (18921970)
Frank Herbert Burnside (18881935)
Paul Verdier Burwell (18911955)

C
Jeanette Doty Caldwell (18951971)
John Lansing Callan (18861958)
Buel Heath Canady (18931986)
Leon Errol Canady (18871978)
Joseph Eugene Carberry (18871961)
Norbert J. Carolin (?1963)
Walter J. Carr (18961970)
Philip A. Carroll (?1957)
Ralph Bigelow Carter (18961984). He was born on New Year's Day, January 1, 1896. He died on July 9, 1984.
Verne Carter (18931964)
Joseph Lee Cato (18881965). He was born on February 18, 1888, in Yakima, Washington. He  made his first solo flight on October 15, 1909, in a single wing airplane that he designed and constructed.
Clyde Vernon Cessna (18791954) of the Cessna Aircraft Company
Alfred Noblet Chandler (18891954)
Charles deForest Chandler (18781939)
Carleton George Chapman (18861971). He was born on June 4, 1886, in Macon, Georgia, to Carleton Burke Chapman (1859-1921) and Flora Smith (1848-1908). He attended the United States Military Academy. He married Martha Drake Womble (1899-1979) in 1924. He died in Fitzgerald, Georgia, on November 11, 1971.
Arthur Reed Christie (18901964)
William Whitney Christmas (18651960). He was born in 1865 in North Carolina. He designed one of the first plane with ailerons. He died at Bellevue Hospital in Manhattan, New York, of pneumonia on April 14, 1960. He had lived at 600 West 144th Street, New York City.
Harry Peter Christofferson (18841968). He was born in Spencer, Iowa, on March 31, 1884. He died on Sunday, December 8, 1968, in a Santa Clara, California, at the age of 84.
Everett Vail Church (18801951). He was born on January 3, 1880, in Brooklyn, New York City. He died on February 12, 1951. He was buried in Green-Wood Cemetery in Brooklyn.
George Russell Clark (18941976)
Virginius Evans Clark (18861948)
Armand Walter Claverie (18961993). He was born on March 10, 1896, in California.  He attended the Curtiss Aviation School in San Diego, California, in the spring of 1912. He soloed on June 15, 1912. His certificate was withheld because he was under the minimum age of 18. He died on January 9, 1993, in San Luis Obispo, California, at age 96.
William R. Clinger (18951935) of Michigan.
Frank Trenholm Coffyn (18781960) 
Stewart Wellesley Cogswell (18911956) aka Stewart Andrew Cogswell
Clarence Blair Coombs (18881944)
John D. Cooper (?1936) of Bridgeport, Connecticut.
Harry Depew Copland (18961976)
Frank T. Courtney (18941982) of England
Parker Dresser Cramer (18961931)
Harvey Crawford (18891971)
Harry Bolton Crewdson (18811956)
William Redmond Cross (18741940)
Henry Kent Crowell (18901955). He was born on June 26, 1890, in New York. He died on March 29, 1955, in North Carolina.
Howard Paul Culver (18931964)
Alfred Austell Cunningham (18811939)
John J. Curran (?1966) of Long Island City, New York.
John Francis Curry (18861973)
Greely Stevenson Curtis Jr. (18711947). He was born on January 19, 1871, to Greely Stevenson Curtis Sr. in Boston, Massachusetts. He died in 1947.
Glenn Hammond Curtiss (18781930)
Levitt Luzern Custer (18881962)

D
John B. Daniell (?1964)
Herbert Arthur Dargue (18861941)
Earl Stanley Daugherty (18871928). He was born on April 4. 1887 in Iowa. He died in 1928.
Howard Calhoun Davidson (18901984) Major General US Army Air Force
Stuart Verne Davis (18741955).
Walter C. Davis Sr. (18931952) 
Frederick Trubee Davison (18961974)
Charles Healy Day (18841955). He was born in Salamanca, New York, on December 29, 1884. He died in Pacific Palisades, California, on May 26, 1955.
Curtiss LaQ. Day (18951972). He was born on May 24, 1896, in Paxton, Illinois. He died in 1972.
Antonio Sanche de Bustamente Jr. (18861951) of Cuba. His father was Antonio Sanche de Bustamente Sr. of Cuba, a judge of the World Court.
Clarence Adair Degiers (18881987)
Dana Chase DeHart (18861975)
Fred Korstad DeKor (18781964). He was born in Lyon County, Iowa, on February 24, 1878. He died in 1964.
Raphael Sergius de Mitkiewicz (18841946)
William Austin Denehie (18911974)
Richard Henry Depew Jr. (18921948). He was born in Plainfield, New Jersey, on May 20, 1892. He died of a cerebral hemorrhage at his home on January 28, 1948.
Lionel Herbert DeRemer (18891962). He was born on February 21, 1889, in Harrison, Michigan, to Mcclennan DeRemer (1866-?). He died in 1962.
Jean Francis DeVillard (1882?). He was born in Fordyce, Arkansas, on February 28, 1882.
Fairman Rogers Dick (18851976). He was born on August 7, 1885. He died in 1976.
Charles Dickinson (18581935). He was made an honorary member. He was born in 1858 which makes him the oldest of the Early Birds of Aviation. He was one of the founding brothers, along with his brothers Albert Dickinson and Nathan Dickinson, of the Dickinson Seed Company in Chicago, Illinois. At the turn of the century it was one of the largest seed companies in the world. Some of his international flights were used to bring back seeds from foreign countries. 
William C. Diehl (18911974)
Ralph Clayton Diggins (18871959) of the Ralph C. Diggins Company. He was born on March 7, 1887, in Cadillac, Michigan, and moved to Chicago, Illinois. He made his first flight in 1912 and was the 26th person in the United States to receive a pilot's license issued by the Aero Club of America. He died in 1959.
William E. Doherty (?1954)
Charles H. Dolan II (18951981)
Charles Dollfus (18931981), the father of Audouin Dollfus.
John Domenjoz (18861952). He was born in Switzerland in 1886. He became an American citizen in 1937. His Blériot airplane is at the National Air and Space Museum. He was the sixth person to loop the loop. He died in 1952.
Burton McKendrie Doolittle (18971990). He was born on 29 January 1897 in Chicago, Illinois. He died on 27 July 1990 in Monterey, California.
Henry Dora (?1977)
Raymond E. Dowd (?1948)
Carl Harry Duede (18861956) of Guthrie County, Iowa.
David Earle Dunlap (18961957)
James Leo Dunsworth (18871956). He was born on February 6, 1887, in Carrollton, Illinois. He was appointed to the United States Military Academy and graduated in 1909. In 1933 he attended the University of Paris. He died on January 12, 1956, in Los Angeles, California.
Francis Victor du Pont (18941962). He was the son of Thomas Coleman du Pont. He was a member of the Delaware State Highway Commission from 1922 to 1949 and was appointed commissioner of the Bureau of Public Roads in 1953 and served to 1955. While serving as Commissioner, he recommended a highway program that led to legislation under which the Interstate Highway System was constructed.

E
Warren Samuel Eaton (18911966)
Herman Anthony Ecker (18881969). He was born on August 31, 1888. He died in July 1969 in Williamsport, Pennsylvania. He was buried in Woodlawn Cemetery in Syracuse, New York.
Samuel B. Eckert (18841973). He was born on Christmas Eve, December 24, 1884, in Philadelphia. first soloed in September 1916 and held Fédération Aéronautique Internationale certificate number 52 as a hydroplane pilot. He died June 2, 1973.
Colonel John P. Edgerly (18881982). He was born on April 3, 1888 in Vermont. He served in the military starting on November 2, 1911. He died on August 12, 1982.
Gustav J. Ekstrom (18951968)
Frank H. Ellis (18961979)
Theodore Gordon Ellyson (18851928)
Albert Elton (18881975). He was born on August 9, 1888, in Youngstown, Ohio.  He soloed on November 9, 1911, at Kinlock Field in St. Louis, Missouri, in a Wright Model B. He was Fédération Aéronautique Internationale license number 75. He died on June 20, 1975, in Columbiana, Ohio.
Raffe Emerson (18801962)
Albert John Engel (18791978). He was born on May 12, 1879. He died in December 1978 in Cleveland, Ohio.
LeRoy M. Ennis (18931978)
Louis G. Erickson (?1946)
Commodore Frithiof Gustaf Ericson (18801941)
Robert Esnault-Pelterie (18811957) of France.
Captain Jonathan Dickinson Este (18871962) of Philadelphia. He was born in 1887 in Philadelphia to Charles Este. He married Lydia Richmond on February 6, 1919, in Washington, D.C.
Francis Thomas Evans Sr. (18861974)
Wilhelm Heinrich Evers (18841960) of Nieder Elbe, Germany.

F
Henri Fabre (18821984). One of the longest and last living aviation pioneers dying at 102.
Elisha Noel Fales (18871970). He was born in Lake Forest, Illinois, on December 23, 1887.  He flew solo on April 2, 1910. He received his B.S. degree from the Massachusetts Institute of Technology in 1911. He died of leukemia on December 29, 1970, at the Good Samaritan Hospital in Baltimore, Maryland.
Charles L. Fay (?1961)
Louis A. Fenouillet (?1943)
Harry Ferguson (18841960) of Ireland.
Major Paul Lee Ferron (18881956). He was born in Philadelphia, Pennsylvania, on March 2, 1888. He died in 1956.
Farnum Thayer Fish (18961978)
Sheplar Ward FitzGerald (18841953)
Maximilian Charles Fleischmann (18771951)
Luis de Florez (18891962)
Anton Herman Gerard Fokker (18901939)
Harry H. Ford (?1969) of Ford Engineering in Bridgeport, Connecticut.
Joseph Roswell Forkner (18921968)
Benjamin Delahauf Foulois (18791967)
Heraclio Alfaro Fournier, the grandson of the founder of Naipes Heraclio Fournier.
Harold S. Fowler (18871957). He was born in Liverpool, England, in 1887. His parents then moved to New York City. He died in Palm Beach, Florida, on January 17, 1957, at the age of 70.
Robert George Fowler (18841966) of San Francisco, California
Roy Newell Francis (18861952)
Joseph Frantz (18901979)
William Yates Fray (18821968)
John Frederick Freund Sr. (18741932). He was born on June 8, 1874, in Frankfurt am Main, Germany. He was the father of John F. Freund (19182001). He died in 1932 at Memorial Hospital in Manhattan, New York City.
Arthur Theodore Frolich (18921936)
Donald Frost (?1950)
John Frost (18831945) 
Rutherford Fullerton (18801952). He was born June 30, 1880, in Columbus, Ohio. He died on May 17, 1952, in Laguna Beach, California. He was buried in Green Lawn Cemetery in Columbus, Ohio.

G
John Rudolph Gammeter (18761957)
Harry Gantz (18881949)
Paul Edward Garber (18991992).
Ben Garrison (18881947)
Ivan R. Gates (18901932)
George Gay (aviator) (18921948)
Louis H. Gertson (18871942)
William Wallace Gibson (18761965)
George S. Gillespie (18891975)
Edgar Allen Goff Jr. (18961989)
Frank W. Goodale (18891948) 
Lewis E. Goodier Jr. (18851961)
Donald H. Gordon (18831968)
Edgar Staley Gorrell (18911945)
Harry T. Graham (18741952)
Charles Hampson Grant (18941987)
Rudolph R. Grant (?1950)
Harry D. Graulich (18961968). He was born in New York City on July 2, 1896. He died on Thursday, October 24, 1968, in Riverside, New Jersey.
George Alphonso Gray (18821956)
John F. Gray (?1976)
William Greene (aviator) (18721952) was a dentist.
David Gregg (aviator) (18951973). He was born in Cambridge, Massachusetts, on September 29, 1895. He died on March 11, 1973. 
Michael Gregor (18881953)
George D. Grundy Jr. (18981998). He was the last member of the Early Birds of Aviation to die.
Emil Gustafson (?1951).

H
Clifton Overman Hadley (18771963) was the first paid airmail pilot. He was born on February 10, 1877, to Alfred Hadley and Keziah K. Overman. He married Nellie M. Callahan on October 21, 1902. He died on June 10, 1963, at Reading Hospital and Medical Center in Reading, Pennsylvania, at age 87.
Ernest C. Hall (18971972)
Colonel George Eustace Amyot Hallett (18901982). He and John Cyril Porte planned to make the first transatlantic flight. They were going to use a flying boat commissioned by Rodman Wanamaker, but were prevented by the start of World War I.
Garnet Roy Halliday (18911955) of Canada. He was born on June 21, 1891, in Canada. He died on January 27, 1955, in Los Angeles, California.
Thomas Foster Hamilton (18941969) of the Hamilton Standard Company.
Lee Hammond (18901932)
Stedman Shumway Hanks (18891979)
Major General Thomas J. Hanley Jr. (18931969)
Lieutenant General Millard Harmon (18881945) was in the United States Army Air Forces during the Pacific campaign in World War II. He died on March 3, 1945.
William Harper Jr. (??)
Helen Hodge Harris (18931967). ♀
Arthur J. Hartman (18881970). He died on October 19, 1970.
Harold Hartney (18881945)
Bert Raymond John Hassell (18931974)
Charles Edward Hathorn (18791955). He was born on December 6, 1879, in of Mason City, Iowa. In 1912 he flew his Curtiss-type biplane from the prairie between Mason City, Iowa, and Clear Lake, Iowa. He died on May 21, 1955, in Los Angeles, California.
William E. Haupt (?1955)
Beckwith Havens (18901969)
Commander Willis Bradley Haviland (18901944)
Alan Ramsay Hawley (18641938)
Jack W. Heard (18871976)
Edward Bayard Heath (18881931)
Andrew Hallenbeck Heermance (18951984)
Major Leo Gerald Heffernan (18891956)
Howard J. Heindell (18961972). He was born in Oil City, Pennsylvania, on August 3, 1896. He died on June 9, 1972.
Albert Sigmund Heinrich (18891974)
Arthur O. Heinrich (18871958). He was born on April 18, 1887.
John C. Henning (18781953)
Charles A. Herrman (?1953)
Charles E. Hess (?1968)
Eugene Heth (18791959), aka Wild Bill Heth.
William A. Hetlich Jr. (?1962)
Robert Penrose Hewitt (18941953). He was born in Philadelphia on July 2, 1894. He died in 1953.
John E. Hickey (18901970). He was born on January 26, 1890, in Springfield, Illinois. He died in Ashland, Illinois, on August 11, 1970, three weeks after his appendix ruptured. 
Frederick C. Hild (18901963). He was born in 1890. He died in Miami, Florida, on October 31, 1963.
Erik Hildes-Heim (18941983)
Stanley Hiller Sr., the father of Stanley Hiller Jr. (19242006)
Edward Foote Hinkle (18761967). He was born on May 22, 1876.
Melvin Wyman Hodgdon (18961980)
Russell F. Holderman (18951981). He was born on February 26, 1895. He died on May 25, 1981 at age 86.
Edward Henry Holterman (18861964)
Max Holtzem (18921980)
Frederick Adam Hoover (18871981)
Orton William Hoover (18911958). He was born on March 11, 1891, in Fairmount, Indiana. He died on June 16, 1958.
Clarence F. Horton (?1964).
Frederick Edgar Hummel (18961975). He was born on August 18, 1896, in Milwaukee, Wisconsin, to John Peter Hummel. He died on May 26, 1975, in Richmond, Virginia.
Frederick Erastus Humphreys (18831941)
Howard Huntington (18851968)
Joseph Raymond Hutchinson (18861975)

I, J
Leslie Leroy Irvin (18951966)
Edwin Kenneth Jaquith (18921984)
William C. Jenkins (?1957) of Staten Island, New York City.
Shakir Saliba Jerwan (18811942)
Christian Johanssen (??)
Major General Davenport Johnson (18901963)
Edward Albert Johnson (18851949)
Frank M. Johnson (?1961). On February 12, 1910 he became the first native Californian to own and fly an airplane.
James M. Johnson (1885?). He was born July 19, 1885, in Helena, Arkansas, to Belle T. and James B. Johnson. He married Cornelia Spencer on June 25, 1912.
Louis Johnson (?1963)
Robert R. Johnson (18911959). He was born in 1891. He was awarded Fédération Aéronautique Internationale certificate number 205 in 1913. He died in St. Louis, Missouri, on November 5, 1959.
Victor G. Johnson (?1983)
Walter Ellsworth Johnson (18891961)
Archibald B. Johnston (?1950)
Byron Quinby Jones (18881959)
Ernest LaRue Jones (18821955)
Harry M. Jones (18901973)
Assen Jordanoff (18961967)

K
John William Kabitzke (18851944). He was born on August 18, 1885, in Milwaukee, Wisconsin, to Paul Peter Kabitzke. He married Roxie Rockcastle. He died on August 15, 1944, in Elgin, Illinois
John G. Kaminski (18931960)
Harold Dewolf Kantner (18861973)
Frank T. Kastory Sr. (18831966). He was born on April 11, 1883 in Nyagy Kikinda, Hungary. He became a United States citizen in 1908. He received Fédération Aéronautique Internationale license number 261 on August 12, 1913. He married Ida Brandenburg on June 27, 1917, in Chicago, Illinois. He died in 1966 in Bradenton, Florida.
Victorin Katchinsky (18911986)
Horace P. Keane (18851974). He was born on July 29, 1885, in St. Joseph, Michigan. He died on May 7, 1974, in Topanga, California.
George Martin Keightley (18861967). He was born on 5 June 5, 1886. He died on December 30, 1967 and was buried in Tennessee.
Edward A. Kelly (??)
Ralph B. Kennard (?1978)
Frank M. Kennedy (?1965)
Walter G. Kilner (18881940)
Leo B. Kimball (18961977)
Wilbur Ravel Kimball (18631940).
Ralph Mason Kinderman (18871969). He was born on August 13, 1887, at Grafton, West Virginia. He died October 21, 1969, in Middletown, New Jersey.
Bertell Wadsworth King (18871968)
Dr. Jerome Kingsbury (18711944)
James L. Kinney (?1976)
Roy Carrington Kirtland (18741941)
Daniel Kiser (?1934)
Augustus Roy Knabenshue (18751960)
Roland Southard Knowlson (18931957) of Kansas City, Missouri
Alfred Koenig (?1960) of Germany.
August Karl Koerbling (18941970). He was born on August 27, 1894. He died on April 29, 1970 in Los Angeles.
Esten Bolling Koger (18811941)
Edward Albert Korn (18881980). He was born on March 2, 1888, in Montra, Ohio, and had an aviator brother, Milton Homer Korn (18891913) who died in an airplane crash. Edward died in September 17, 1980, in Sea Girt, New Jersey. He was buried in Evergreen Cemetery in Lansing, Michigan.
James S. Krull (18891978)
Carl T. Kuhl (?1952)

L
Božena Laglerová (18861941). Czech pioneer aviator. She became first woman licensed by the Austrian Aero Club and second woman licensed by Germany.
John Kerr LaGrone (18901953)
Frank Purdy Lahm (18771963)
Emil Matthew Laird (18961982). He put the first commercial aircraft into production at his E. M. Laird Aviation Company. 
Dean Ivan Lamb (18861956)
Albert Bond Lambert (18751946)
Corporal William Antony Lamkey (?1963). He died on January 7, 1963 at the Veterans Hospital, in West Los Angeles, California.
Jean Marie Landrey (18881956)
Boyd Latham (?1961)
Ruth Bancroft Law (18871970) ♀
Frank William LaVista (18931963). He was born on March 11, 1893 in New York City. He attended North Carolina University. By 1930 he was living in Hempstead, New York. He died on July 1, 1963.
Oliver Colin LeBoutillier (18941983)
E. Hamilton Lee (18921994)
Robert Edward Lee (18861973)
Walter Edwin Lees (18871957)
Bruce Gardner Leighton (18921965)
Willy Lenert (18851968) aka Willie Lenert of Michigan
Lawrence Leon (18891965)
Lawrence J. Lesh (18921965)
Samuel C. Lewis (18861946)
Goethe Link (18791980)
Walter Lissauer (18821965). He migrated from Germany to New Jersey.
Allan Haines Lockheed (18891969)
Grover C. Loening (18881976)
Albin Kasper Longren (18821950)
Flavius Earl Loudy (?1953)
Israel Ludlow (18731955)

M
Colonel Theodore Charles Macaulay (18871965). He was born on September 30, 1887, in Minnesota. He died on April 19, 1965, in San Diego, California. He was buried in Fort Rosecrans National Cemetery.
Leslie C. MacDill (18891938) ✝. He died in an aircrash.
Charles Stuart MacDonald (18841953)
Robert Francis MacFie (18811943)
Emory Conrad Malick (18811958)
Kenneth Marr (?1963)
James Cairn Mars (18751944). He was the 11th licensed pilot in the United States.
Richard C. Marshall (??). He was an airmail pilot.
Glenn Luther Martin (18861955)
Colonel Harold S. Martin (18921961)
James Vernon Martin (18851956)
Didier Masson (18861950) of France
William A. Mattery (?1960) of Hornell, New York.
Hiram Percy Maxim (18691936)
James C. McBride (??)
James B. McCalley Jr. (??)
John W. McClaskey (?1953)
Governor John Alexander Douglas McCurdy (18861961)
Edward Orrick McDonnell (18911960)
Lieutenant William Maitland McIlvain (18851963)
George F. McLaughlin (?1962)
Lieutenant Emil Meinecke (18921975)
George Meissner (18941947)
Russell L. Meredith (?1965)
Glenn Edmund Messer (18951995). He was born in Henry County, Iowa on July 12, 1895. He died on June 13, 1995 in Birmingham, Alabama.
Cord Meyer, possibly the father of Cord Meyer
Charles W. Meyers (18961972)
Bernetta Miller (18841972). ♀ She was the fifth licensed woman pilot in the United States.
Lestere Miller (18941963)
Lloyd E. Miller (18901968), aka Hank Miller.
William C. Miller (??)
Thomas DeWitt Milling (18871960)
Frank Mills (aviator) (?1940)
Robert J. Minshall (?1954) of Seattle, Washington.
Arthur H. Mix (18851971). He was born on March 19, 1885.
Matilde Moisant (18781964). ♀ She was the second woman in the United States to get a pilot's license.
Robert S. Moore (18671944)
Stuart A. Morgan (18931975)
Raymond Vincent Morris (18901943). He was born on 31 August 1890 in Milford, Connecticut. He died on 6 July 1943.
Percy George Brockhurst Morriss (18851944)
Hollis LeRoy Muller (18871949)
Herbert Arthur Munter Sr. (18951970). He was born on 13 June 1894 in Seattle, Washington. He died on 24 May 1970 in Concord, California.
George Dominic Murray (18891956)
Edwin Charles Musick (18941938)
George Francis Meyers (18651961)

N 
Earl L. Naiden (18941944)
C. Edward Nelson (??)
Nels J. Nelson (18871964)
Douglas Blakeshaw Netherwood (18851943)
George Netzow (18891977) of Neuenbrook, Germany
John M. H. Nichols (?1982)
Charles Franklin Niles (18881916)
Russell B. North (18931972)

O
Willy Otto Ober (18951971)
Edward Olivier (1886?). He was born on July 26, 1886, in Philadelphia, Pennsylvania. He died in Los Angeles, California.
Earle Lewis Ovington (18791936)

P and Q
George A. Page Jr. (?1983)
Stanley H. Page (??)
Joseph Marie Pallissard (18861960)
Harry Park (18691955)
Evan Jenkins Parker (18851966)
Fred F. Parker (?1965)
Will D. Parker (?1981)
Agustín Parlá Orduña (18871946). First man to flight from Key West to Mariel, Cuba, and set a world record in 1913.
Edwin Charles Parsons (18921968)
Charles H. Paterson (??)
John W. Pattison (18841957). He was born on March 10, 1884, in Milford, Ohio. He died on January 24, 1957.
Felix Wladyslaw Pawlowski (18761951)
Charles Wesley Peters (1889?) Regarded as the first African American pilot.
John F. Petre (?1969)
Luba G. Phillips (18881959)
Elmo Neale Pickerill (18851968)
Sydney Pickles (18941975)
Percy Pierce (?1962)
Samuel S. Pierce (18871973). He died on August 4, 1973, in Milton, Massachusetts.

Augustus Post (18741952) Post was a classic American adventurer who distinguished himself as an automotive pioneer, balloonist, early aviator, writer, actor, musician and lecturer. He was the 13th man to fly in an airplane, coined the term "airport," conceived and organized the transatlantic air crossing that became the Lindbergh flight, and served a secretary to the Aero Club of America for more than 20 years. 
Edwin M. Post Jr. (18931973)
George Birkbeck Post (18911960)
Claude Washington Pound (18851980).
Clarence Oliver Prest (18961954)
Maurice L. Prévost (18871952) of France. He was born in France on September 22, 1887. He married Jeanne Catherine Françoise Mulaton (18811956) in Reims in 1921. He died in Neuilly-sur-Seine on November 27, 1952.
Frederick Holly Prime (18881985)
Frederick H. Prince Jr. (?1962)
John Daniel Probst Jr. (18951932). He was born on July 18, 1895 in New York.
Ira J. Profitt (18881972) He was born in 1888. He died on August 24, 1972, at the Santa Monica Hospital in Santa Monica, California, at the age of 80.
George H. Prudden (18931964)
Sam A. Purcell (?1942)
Harriet Quimby (18751912) ♀ first American female licensed pilot

R
Ira Adelbert Rader (18871958)
Admiral DeWitt Clinton Ramsey (18881961). He was born in 1888. He died on September 7, 1961, at the Naval Hospital Philadelphia at age 72.
Alexander Rankin (18871948). He was born on March 15, 1887, in Frostburg, Maryland.
Arthur Ray (??)
Albert Cushing Read (18871967)
Charles Reed (?1941)
Andrew Reid (18871955)
Marshall Earle Reid (18831967)
Clearton Howard Reynolds (18831930). He was born in 1883 in Middletown, Orange County, New York. He died on Valentine's Day, February 14, 1930, in an automobile accident in Mt. Clemens, Michigan. He was buried in Arlington National Cemetery.
Harry V. Reynolds (?1951)
Harrison C. Richards (??)
Holden Chester Richardson (18781960)
Arthur L. Richmond (18961955)
Howard Max Rinehart (18851949)
Hugh Armstrong Robinson (18811963)
Jean Alfred Roche (18941977)
Colonel Robert Lockerbie Rockwell (18921958). He was born on March 18, 1892, in Cincinnati, Ohio. He died on January 24, 1958, in San Bernardino, California.
Wallace L. Rockwell (?1969)
Bernard Francis Roehrig (18801948)
Roland Rohlfs (18921974)
Domingo Rosillo del Toro (18781957)
Oliver Andrew Rosto (18811972). He was born on August 24, 1881. He made his first flight November 5, 1909 in a monoplane of his own design. He died of a stroke on April 10, 1972.
Major General Ralph Royce (18901965)
George F. Russell (??) of Brooklyn, New York City.
Lucille Belmont Rutshaw (?1961) ♀

S
Gustavo Adolfo Salinas Camiña (18931964)
Alberto Salinas Carranza (18921970) of Mexico.
Bert Saunders (?1945) of San Francisco, California.
 Brigadier General Martin F. Scanlon (18891980). He was born on August 11, 1889. He died on January 26, 1980, at Walter Reed Army Medical Center.
Lieutenant William G. Schauffer (?1951)
Frank Schoeber (18911970). He was born in New York City on April 21, 1891. He soloed a plane in August 1912 in Mineola, New York. He had a stroke in 1961. He died on July 19, 1970, in Cape May, New Jersey, at the age of 79.
Rudolf William Schroeder (18861952)
Major Edward Graf Schultz (18981943). ✝ He was born in 1898 in New Jersey. He was killed in action on July 29, 1943 near Yangkai, China after returning from a bombing mission over Hong Kong.
Blanche Stuart Scott (18851970) ♀
 Lieutenant Lyle H. Scott (18861930). ✝ He was killed in an aircrash.
George Henry Scragg (18901968)
William Edmund Scripps (18821952)
Howard M. Shafer (18931973)
Castle W. Shaffer (18821954) aka Lucky Bob Saint Henry.
Cleve Thomas Shaffer (18841964). He was born on December 3, 1884.
Walter J. Shaffer (18911974)
Robert F. Shank  (18911968)
Samuel H. Sharp (?1965)
Benson Russell Shaw (18941961)
William H. Sheahan (18721956). He was born on August 22, 1872. He died on September 11, 1956. His archive is housed at the National Air and Space Museum.
A. P. Shirley (?1951)
Charles W. Shoemaker (18911950)
Joseph Clark Shoemaker (18811956). He was born in Bridgeton, New Jersey, on January 8, 1881, to Clement Waters Shoemaker. He attended Princeton University. he died in 1956.
Igor Ivanovich Sikorsky (18891972)
Milton H. Simmons (?1969)
Oliver G. Simmons (18781948)
Robert Simon (??)
Dorothy Rice Sims (18891960) ♀
Cecil Raymond Sinclair (1881986). He was born on April 8, 1888, in Chandlerville, Illinois
Albert Daniel Smith (18871970)
Hilder Florentina Smith (18901977) ♀
James Floyd Smith (18841956) 
Jay Dee Smith (18891963). First commercial flight in the world, Saint Petersburg, Florida
Lawton Vasque Smith (18941963)
Major General Ralph C. Smith (18931998)
Orval Huff Snyder (18921951) was treasurer for Aire-Kraft
Oscar A. Solbrig (18701941)
Sir Thomas Octave Murdoch Sopwith (18881989)
Carl Andrew Spaatz (18911974)
Commander Earl Winfield Spencer Jr. (18881950)
Percival Hopkins Spencer (18971995)
Thomas Eric Springer (18921971)
Anthony Stadlman (18861982).
William M. Stark (?1942)
Arney P. Stenrud (18951955)
Thomas E. Steptoe (18841960)
John B. Stetson, possibly a descendant of John Batterson Stetson
Robert J. Stewart (18831948)
Edward Stinson (18931932)
Katherine Stinson (18911977) ♀
Marjorie Stinson (18951975) ♀
Paul R. Stockton (18801962)
Arthur Burr Stone (18741943)
Elmer Fowler Stone (18871936)
Lieutenant General George Edward Stratemeyer (18901969)
John Gale Stratton (?1961)
Paul Studenski (18881936)
Max F. Stupar (18851944) 
Hugo Sundstedt (18861966)
Harry B. Suppe (?1969)
William Fred Suppe (?1969)
Andrew M. Surini (18941958)
Adolph Gilbert Sutro (18911981). He was born on October 25, 1891, in San Francisco, California.
John Redondo Benjamin Sutton (18901947)

T
Maurice Tabuteau (18841976)
Gurdon Lucius Tarbox (18881971)
Lansing Kellogg Tevis (18931957)
Lieutenant Colonel William Thaw (18931934)
Joseph H. Thomas (?1965)
William T. Thomas (18881966)
DeLloyd Thompson (18881949)
Carl H. Thomsen (?1984)
Charles Burrell Tibbs (18961965)
Samuel Alexander Tickell (18901966). He was born on September 4, 1890, in New York City, New York, He died in 1966.
Carter Tiffany (18961977)
Otto William Timm (18931978)
Henry Edwards Toncray (18941929)
Joseph R. Torrey (18921983)
Admiral John Henry Towers (18851955) was a United States Navy admiral and pioneer naval aviator. He made important contributions to the technical and organizational development of naval aviation from its very beginnings, eventually serving as Chief of the Bureau of Aeronautics (1939–1942). He commanded carrier task forces during World War II, and retired in December 1947. He and Marc Mitscher were the only early Naval Aviation pioneers to survive the extreme hazards of early flight to remain with naval aviation throughout their careers. He was the first naval aviator to achieve flag rank and was the most senior advocate for naval aviation during a time when the Navy was dominated by battleship admirals. Towers spent his last years supporting aeronautical research and advising the aviation industry.
James Clifford Turpin (18861966)
Horace B. Tuttle (18811964)
John H. Tweed (?1961)

U
Ralph Hazlett Upson (18881968)

V
George E. Van Arsdale (?1948)
Clifford C. Vandivort (18931938) of Pennsylvania. He was the son of Margaret and Ezra Vandivort
Stanley Irving Vaughn (18861972). He was born on December 16, 1886, to Tillinghast Mowry Vaughn and Adell P. Case. He died on March 9, 1972, in Columbus, Ohio
Victor Vernon (18831968)
J. B. R. Verplanck (18811955) of Fishkill-on-Hudson, New York, aviator who flew in the 1913 Great Lakes Reliability Cruise
Logan Archbold Vilas (18911976), aka Jack Vilas
Sydney Archibald Vincent (18941976). He was born on June 28, 1894, in Faribault, Minnesota. He resided in Tabb, Virginia, in 1945 when he worked for Newport News Shipbuilding.

W
Henry Roy Waite (18841978)
Henry W. Walden (18831964)
Lesley Lewis Walker Sr. (18881960) of the L. L. Walker Company.  He was born on October 2, 1888, and died on August 5, 1960.  Buried in Houston, Texas at Forest Park Lawndale Cemetery.  A pioneer aviator, automobile and speedboat racer who built and flew his own plane in 1910.  Born in Willow Spings, Missour and died in Houston, Texas.  His grave marker is inscibed with "Early Aviator - E.B. - Q.B. - O.X.5."
Arthur Pratt Warner (18701957)
Robert A. Warren (18821990). He was born in 1882 in Mattapoisett, Massachusetts. He died on February 8, 1990, in Jupiter, Florida, at age 98.
Waldo Deane Waterman (18941976)
Hugh Watson (18941955)
Clifford Lawrence Webster (18911980). He was born on May 14, 1891, in Haverhill, Massachusetts. He died on Christmas Eve, December 24, 1980, in Palm Beach, Florida.
Harry J. Webster (18861963) of Duluth, Minnesota.
Elling Oliver Weeks (18891956)
Howard Franklin Wehrle (18901964)
Charles F. West (18991972).
John Weston (aviator) aka Maximilian John Ludwick Weston (1872-1950). Pioneer African aviator.
Ivan Pangburn Wheaton Sr. (18941975). He was born on August 15, 1894. He died on June 20, 1975.
Ray Wheeler (aviator)
Bernard Leonard Whelan (18901983). He was born in Cincinnati, Ohio, on November 19, 1890. Later his family moved to Dayton, Ohio, where he attended the University of Dayton. He then worked in the sales department of National Cash Register. He died on March 27, 1983, in Palm Beach, Florida.
John Taylor Hammond Whitaker (18961959). He was born on March 6, 1896, in Somerset, Ohio. He died on October 19, 1959, in Palo Alto, California He was buried at Golden Gate National Cemetery. 
George Clarke Whiting (18941981)
Kenneth Whiting (18811943)
Kirby Lewis Whitsett (18961959)
Charles D. Wiggin (?1964)
Charles Livingston Wiggin (??)
Paul E. Wilbur (?1979)
Horace Bird Wild (18791940)
Francis Alexes Wildman (18821956). sometimes spelled Francis Alexis Wildman. He  was born on November 4, 1882 in New York. He died on August 13, 1956, in San Diego, California.
Charles F. Willard (18831977). He was the first barnstormer, as well as the chief engineer for Glenn L. Martin and designed flying boats with Glenn Curtiss.
William P. Willets (18901964). He was born in Skaneateles, New York, on May 13, 1890.
George W. Williams Jr. (?1931) of Temple, Texas.
Harold Buckley Willis (18901962)
Hugh De Laussat Willoughby (18561939)
Frederick Joseph Wiseman (18751961)
Charles Christian Witmer (18821929)
Charles Rudolph Wittemann (18841967). He was born on September 15, 1884. He died on July 8, 1967, at the Jersey Shore Medical Center in Neptune City, New Jersey.
Clyde Murvin Wood (18871967)
Frank Wilbur Wright (18861950) 
Orville Wright (honorary member)
Roderick Marion Wright (18871960). Roderick M. Wright was born March 24, 1887 to Lodena and James Marion Wright. He died on October 13, 1960. He was buried in Oak Grove Cemetery.
Wilbur Wright (honorary member)
James Meinrad Wulpi (18891986)
Charles D. Wyman (?1955)
Forrest Egan Wysong (18941992)

Y 
George Elam Yeager (18781953)
David H. Young (1894-1978)
Edward H. Young (?1948)

Z
Second Lieutenant Errol Henry Zistel (18951968)

♀ denotes a female aviator''
✝ denotes died in an aviation accident.

See also
 Aero Club of America
 List of fatalities from aviation accidents
 List of pilots awarded an Aviator's Certificate by the Aéro-Club de France in 1909
 List of pilots awarded an Aviator's Certificate by the Aéro-Club de France in 1910

References

External links
 

 Early Birds of Aviation archive at the Smithsonian

 
 
1928 establishments in the United States
Aviation history of the United States
Organizations established in 1928